Dongola is an unincorporated community in Gibson County, Indiana, in the United States.

History
Dongola was laid out in 1851. It was likely named after Dongola, in Sudan. A post office was established at Dongola in 1851, and remained in operation until it was discontinued in 1862.

References

Unincorporated communities in Gibson County, Indiana
1851 establishments in Indiana
Unincorporated communities in Indiana